Kundapura Assembly constituency is one of the 224 Legislative Assembly constituencies of Karnataka state in India.

It is part of Udupi district.

Members of the Legislative Assembly

Election results

2018

1952

See also
 List of constituencies of the Karnataka Legislative Assembly
 Udupi district

References

Udupi district
Assembly constituencies of Karnataka